Lake Mamacocha (Quechua mama mother / madam, qucha lake, mama qucha ocean, Mama Qucha) is a lake in Peru located in the Huánuco Region, Huacaybamba Province, Pinra District. The river Pinra originates in or near the lake. It is an affluent of the Marañón River.

References 

Lakes of Peru
Lakes of Huánuco Region